Mahanaim ( Maḥănayīm, "camps") is a place mentioned a number of times by the Bible said to be near Jabbok, in the same general area as Jabesh-gilead, beyond the Jordan River. Although two possible sites have been identified, the precise location of Mahanaim is uncertain. Tell edh-Dhahab el-Gharbi, the western one of the twin Tulul adh-Dhahab tells, is one proposed identification.

Biblical narrative
In the Biblical narrative, the first mentioned of Mahanaim occurs in the Book of Genesis as the place where Jacob, returning from Padan-aram to southern Canaan, had a vision of angels. Believing it to be "God's camp", Jacob names the place Mahanaim (Hebrew for "Two Camps", or "Two Companies") to memorialize the occasion of his own company sharing the place with God's. Later in the story, Jacob is moved by fear at the approach of his brother Esau (whom he has reason to fear) and as a result divided his retinue into two hosts (two companies), hence the town built on the site took two hosts as its name. 

According to the Book of Joshua and 1 Chronicles it became a Levitical city (cf. ), having been located at the southern boundary of Bashan until the conquest of Canaan by the Israelites. 

In the Biblical narrative, around the start of the United Monarchy, the city was a stronghold that had been adapted to serve as a sanctuary for important fugitives (2 Samuel 18:2); the narrative states that after King Saul died, Abner, the commander of Saul’s army, established Saul’s son, Ish-bosheth, in Mahanaim as king of Israel (2 Samuel 2:8). 

Mahanaim is the location to which David is described as fleeing while at war with his son Absalom; having arrived at Mahanaim (2 Samuel 17:24), David is described as having sheltered with a man named Barzillai, and having mustered forces there to combat Absalom's army. It is also the location that the Bible states was the place where David was informed about his victory over Absalom, and the death of his son.

The "dance of Mahanaim" is mentioned in Song of Songs 6:13.

Historical analysis
According to Gaston Maspero (The Struggle of the Nations, p. 773), Mahanaim was among the cities plundered by Shishak during his invasion (1 Kings 14:25) of Israelitish territory, also Champollion, Rosellini and Budge share his view identifying Ma'hanema' with Mahanaim. There is no subsequent reference to the city in the annals, and it is not improbable that a vigorous resistance to Shishak or to some other invader brought about its utter demolition.

References

Book of Genesis
Book of Joshua
Books of Chronicles
Books of Samuel
Books of Kings
Song of Songs
Torah places
Levitical cities
Kingdom of Israel (united monarchy)